{{Infobox station
| name                = Great Bridge North
| status              = Disused
| image               = 
| caption             = Great Bridge North station site, being lifted in preparation for the metro extension and soon for freight traffic
| borough             = Great Bridge, Sandwell
| country             = England
| coordinates         = 
| grid_name           = Grid reference
| grid_position       = 
| platforms           = 2 (3)
| original            = South Staffordshire Railway
| pregroup            = London and North Western Railway
| postgroup           = London, Midland and Scottish Railway
| years1              = 1850
| events1             = Opened as Great Bridge
| years2              = 1950
| events2             = Renamed Great Bridge North| years3              = 1964
| events3             = Closed to passengers
| years4              = 1972
| events4             = Closed outright
}}Great Bridge North railway station''' was a station on the South Staffordshire Line in England.

History
The station was built in 1850 and served by the South Staffordshire Railway, which was later absorbed by the London and North Western Railway) which in 1923 amalgamated with several other railways to create the London, Midland and Scottish Railway (the station shared the name Great Bridge with its Great Western Railway counterpart built in 1866). North'' was appended to the name of the station just after nationalisation.

Passenger usage declined in the early 1880s, and the line became mainly freight in 1887. It remained open for goods traffic as the district became highly industrialised in the heyday of the Black Country's industrial past.  Local industry declined after World War II and road transport became more common.  British Rail closed the station to passengers through the Beeching Axe in 1964, but it continued as a freight station for local factories until 1972.  Goods trains continued to pass through the site of the station until 1993.  By that date no sign of the station or the goods yard remained.  It is now derelict and mostly fenced off.

Midland Metro
A £1,100,000/15-year-long regeneration project is expected to re-open the closed section of railway through Dudley as a combined Midland Metro tramway with a separate heavy rail line for goods trains.  The old station site is earmarked as the location of a Midland Metro stop on the local tram network's second line between Walsall, Dudley Port railway station, Dudley railway station and the Merry Hill Shopping Centre scheduled for opening upon completion in 2011.SDIT The freighters would continue on past Brettell Lane railway station and on to the mainline at Stourbridge junction.

Gallery

See also

Round Oak Steel Terminal
Dudley Freightliner Terminal

References

 

Disused railway stations in Sandwell
Railway stations in Great Britain opened in 1850
Railway stations in Great Britain closed in 1964
Beeching closures in England
Former London and North Western Railway stations